Thomas Asshenden may refer to:

Thomas Asshenden (MP fl.1377-1390), MP for Dartmouth
Thomas Asshenden (MP fl.1420-1437), MP for Dartmouth